Roman Will (born 22 May 1992) is a Czech professional ice hockey goaltender currently playing with HC Dynamo Pardubice of the Czech Extraliga (ELH). He has formerly appeared in the National Hockey League (NHL) with the Colorado Avalanche.

Playing career
As a youth, Will played with BK Mladá Boleslav and later made his professional debut in a Czech Extraliga relegation game after the 2010–11 season. With an ambition to be drafted and play in the NHL, Will was drafted 29th overall by the Moncton Wildcats in the 2011 CHL Import Draft and subsequently moved to North America for a season of major junior hockey with the Wildcats of the Quebec Major Junior Hockey League in 2011–12. As the Wildcats starter, Will appeared in 63 games for 29 wins and was selected to the 2012 QMJHL First All-Star Team.

Undrafted, Will returned to the Czech Republic, signing a two-year contract to newly relegated BK Mladá Boleslav of the 1. národní hokejová liga. In the 2012–13 season, Will shared starting duties and appeared in 44 games. Although just a 20-year-old, he led the league with a 1.87 goals against average.

After helping Boleslav gain promotion back to the Extraliga, he was re-signed to a one-year contract on 2 May 2014. However, on 15 May 2014, Will's NHL ambition was further realized when he was signed to a two-year entry level contract with the Colorado Avalanche.

In his first North American season in 2014–15, Will was initially assigned to back up the Avalanche's AHL affiliate, the Lake Erie Monsters. He made his debut with the Monsters on 17 October 2014 against the Chicago Wolves. He later recorded his first career AHL win against the Toronto Marlies on 30 November 2014, before he was assigned to earn more time in the crease with secondary affiliate, the Fort Wayne Komets of the ECHL. Will shone with the Komets and earned his first accolade as the ECHL's goaltender of the week from 5 January 2015. He recorded 17 wins in 29 games, leading all rookies in goals against average, and played in all seven post-season games with Fort Wayne to be selected in the ECHL All-Rookie Team.

In the following 2015–16 season, after attending his second Avalanche training camp, Will was assigned to new AHL affiliate, the San Antonio Rampage. On 26 January 2015, with the Rampage's starting Goaltender Calvin Pickard already promoted to the NHL, Will was recalled to the Avalanche on an emergency basis to backup Pickard due to unavailability with starter Semyon Varlamov. With Pickard struggling with illness, Will made his NHL debut in relief with the Avalanche that same night, appearing in 18 minutes of ice time and stopping 2 of 3 shots in a 6-1 defeat to the San Jose Sharks. Will was returned to the Rampage following the game on 29 January 2016.

After his second professional North American season, Will, in search of more playing time, left the Avalanche organization to return to the Czech Republic in agreeing to an optional two-year deal with HC Bílí Tygři Liberec of the Czech Extraliga on 10 May 2016.

Will matured and performed as a standout statistically for three seasons in the Extraliga with Bílí Tygři Liberec. Following the 2018–19 season, Will left the Czech Republic as a free agent and agreed to a two-year contract with Swedish club, Rögle BK of the Swedish Hockey League, on 9 May 2019. Securing the role as starting goaltender, Will registered an impressive 23 wins from 34 games, helping Rögle finish the regular season in third place, their highest position in franchise history.

On 15 April 2020, Will was released from his contract with Rögle to take up a lucrative two-year offer from Russian club, Traktor Chelyabinsk of the Kontinental Hockey League (KHL).

After two largely successful seasons as Traktor's starting goaltender, Will left Russia at the conclusion of his contract and returned to his native homeland, agreeing to a three-year contract with HC Dynamo Pardubice of the ELH on 10 May 2022.

Career statistics

Regular season and playoffs

International

Awards and honours

References

External links
 

1992 births
Living people
HC Bílí Tygři Liberec players
BK Mladá Boleslav players
Colorado Avalanche players
Czech ice hockey goaltenders
HC Dynamo Pardubice players
Fort Wayne Komets players
Lake Erie Monsters players
Moncton Wildcats players
Ice hockey players at the 2022 Winter Olympics
Olympic ice hockey players of the Czech Republic
Rögle BK players
San Antonio Rampage players
Sportspeople from Plzeň
Traktor Chelyabinsk players
Undrafted National Hockey League players
Czech expatriate ice hockey players in Canada
Czech expatriate ice hockey players in the United States
Czech expatriate ice hockey players in Sweden
Czech expatriate ice hockey players in Russia